Sorrell may refer to:

People
 Andrew Sorrell (born 1985), American politician
 Elizabeth Sorrell, British water-colour painter
 Herbert Sorrell (1897–1973), American union leader
 John Sorrell (designer) (born 1945), British designer
 John Sorrell (ice hockey) (1906–1984), Canadian ice hockey left winger
 Keturah Sorrell (1912–2012), English opera singer and actress
 Kevin Sorrell (born 1977), English rugby player
 Martin Sorrell (born 1945), English businessman
 Nancy Sorrell (born 1974), English lap dancer, model, actress and TV presenter
 Ray Sorrell, former Australian rules footballer
 Vic Sorrell (1901–1972), American Major League Baseball pitcher
 William Sorrell (born 1947), attorney general of Vermont
 Sorrell Booke (1930–1994), American actor best known for playing Boss Hogg on The Dukes of Hazzard

Fictional characters
 Buddy Sorrell, a regular character on the television show The Dick Van Dyke Show
 Vinny Sorrell, on Coronation Street between 1999 and 2000

Other uses
 Sorell, Tasmania, a town in Tasmania
 Sorrell, Virginia, an unincorporated community
 Sorrell Aviation, an American aircraft manufacturer

See also
 Sorrell's, California, a former settlement
 Walter Sorrells (born 1962), American author of mystery and suspense novels
 Sorel (disambiguation) 
 Sorell (disambiguation)
 Sorrel (disambiguation)